A signals brigade is a specialised form of military brigade dedicated to providing communications.  Other brigades might have a signals component, but a signals brigade is a brigade dedicated to information and communication support (ICS) for both operational and administrative functions. It may also contain elements of life support for military headquarters.

List of signals brigades

Royal Corps of Signals
1st Signal Brigade
2nd (National Communications) Signal Brigade
11th Signal Brigade
Indian Army
6 Signals Brigades for each of the Combatant Commands of the Army
3 Signals Brigades for three of the Strike Corps of the Western Command and Northern Command.
Serbian Armed Forces
Signal Brigade (Serbia)
Sri Lanka Signals Corps
Signal Brigade (Sri Lanka)
U.S. Army Signal Corps
1st Signal Brigade, subordinate to the Eighth United States Army
2nd Signal Brigade, subordinate to the 5th Signal Command
3rd Signal Brigade, former unit subordinate to the III Corps
7th Signal Brigade, subordinate to the 5th Signal Command
11th Signal Brigade, an element of Army Forces Command
15th Signal Brigade, based at Fort Gordon
22nd Signal Brigade, former unit subordinate to the V Corps
35th Signal Brigade, an element of Army Forces Command
93rd Signal Brigade, subordinate to the 7th Signal Command
160th Signal Brigade, support the United States Central Command and Third United States Army
261st Theater Tactical Signal Brigade, a unit in the Delaware Army National Guard
516th Signal Brigade, subordinate to the 311th Signal Command

See also
Military communications